Panik is a köy (village) in the Iğdır central district of Iğdır Province, Turkey.

Etymology 
The village's name Panik is an antiquated word in Armenian referring to something artful or eloquent.

History 
The name of the village is mentioned as Panik in the records of 1901 and 1928. This name lasted until it was changed in 1960 to Özdemir. However, the name was reverted to Panik in 2014.

Panik was an Armenian inhabited settlement prior to the Armenian-Turkish war in 1920, with a population of 960 in 1886.

Population 
Panik is now a Kurdish majority settlement. Its population is 2,737 (2020).

References 

Kurdish settlements in Turkey
Iğdır Central District
Towns in Turkey
Populated places in Iğdır Province
Former Armenian inhabited settlements